Editora Globo S.A. (Globo Editors) is a Brazilian publishing house, property of Fundação Roberto Marinho. It began as a bookstore called Livraria do Globo, created in Porto Alegre, in December 1883, by Laudelino Pinheiro de Barcellos and Saturnino Alves Pinto.

History
The bookstore "Livraria do Globo" begun as in a little store located at "Rua da Praia" Number 268. The bookstore was open daily from 6:30 am to 10:00 pm, including Saturdays. With a little business success, the bookstore started working as a copy and paperwork center, making bookbidings and other small services and the building where it was located underwent a slight remodeling.

Its first branch store was created in Santa Maria, near the old ferryway center of Rio Grande do Sul. The "Livraria do Globo's" owners decided to create an own magazine, called "Revista do Globo".

In the 1940s, the bookstore company reached its top success, with three branch stores in Brazil's South Region and offices in Rio de Janeiro and São Paulo. In 1986, the bookstore was sold to Rio Gráfica Editora, property of Fundação Roberto Marinho, that decided to rename its publishing house to Editora Globo, which continues as the current name.

Main titles
These are the main titles published by Editora Globo (books are not included because there are innumerous titles published on many  different subjects):

 Magazines
 Revista Época
 Revista Época São Paulo
 Revista Época Negócios
 Galileu
 Auto Esporte
 Casa & Jardim
 Crescer
 Criativa
 Globo Rural
 Marie Claire
 Pequenas Empresas & Grandes Negócios
 Quem
 Revista Fantástico
 Monet
 Custom Magazines
 Diva
 Viva Seda
 Loony
 Renner
 Books
 Globo Livros
 Websites
 Valor Investe, investment news and information
Have been published 1002 books and 69 collections.

See also
Análise Editorial
Editora Abril

References

External links
Editora Globo Official Website
Bonelli Comics Official Website

Book publishing companies of Brazil
Comic book publishing companies of Brazil
Grupo Globo subsidiaries
Companies based in Rio Grande do Sul
Mass media in Rio de Janeiro (city)
Mass media in São Paulo
Publishing companies established in 1883
Publishing companies established in 1986
Magazine publishing companies of Brazil
Mass media in Porto Alegre